Gairm was a Scottish Gaelic quarterly magazine founded in 1951 by Derick Thomson, and Finlay J. MacDonald (Fionnlagh Domhnallach). Its first issue was published in Autumn 1952. MacDonald served as an editor until 1964; Thomson remained present for decades until it ceased publication in 2004, producing just over 200 issues in total. According to Alan Campbell, the magazine was a "one-man show;" he explained that Thomson "sustained something very valuable for a long period of time." Although it had a relatively low circulation, it was influential on Gaelic literature as it was the longest-running Gaelic literary magazine of the 20th century, in circulation for more than twice as long as its predecessor, Guth na Bliadhna. Gairm attempted to encompass a variety of perspectives and themes, and "disseminated a lot of work that we weren't aware of" in the words of Martin MacDonald. As well as being familiar to most literate Gaels, the magazine attracted almost all influential Gaelic writers who were active, including Sorley MacLean, Iain Crichton Smith, George Campbell Hay, and  Dòmhnall MacAmhlaigh.

Some of the most influential Gaelic poems of the twentieth century were published in the magazine, most notably "Hallaig" by Sorley MacLean in 1954. Gairm also published short stories by Eilidh Watt and Iain Crichton Smith. There were also translations (for example the poetry of Anna Achmatova translated by Crìsdean Whyte, Issue 125, Winter 1983–1984) and other Gaelic literary works (by Dòmhnall Eachann Meek or Dòmhnall MacAmhlaigh) were an important part of Gairm.

When Gairm ceased to publish, a new magazine, Gath (2003–8), took its place, followed by Steall, whose first issue was published in 2016.

An index of articles in Gairm can be found on the Am Baile website using their newspaper index search.

Writers for Gairm 
 Sorley MacLean
 Iain Crichton Smith
 George Campbell Hay
 Crìsdean Whyte
 Dòmhnall Eachann Meek
 Dòmhnall MacAmhlaigh
 Eilidh Watt
 Iain Moireach
 Maoilios Caimbeul 
 Catrìona NicGumaraid
 Ruaraidh MacThòmais
 Iain MacLeòid
 Anna Frater

References

External links
Editorial records

1951 establishments in Scotland
Scottish Gaelic magazines
Magazines established in 1951
Magazines published in Scotland
Scottish Gaelic literature
Literary magazines published in Scotland
Defunct literary magazines published in the United Kingdom
2004 disestablishments in Scotland
Magazines disestablished in 2004
Quarterly magazines published in the United Kingdom